Pachyrhizodus is an extinct genus of ray-finned fish that lived during the Cretaceous to Paleocene in what is now Europe, North America, South America, and Oceania. Many species are known, primarily from the Cretaceous of England and the midwestern United States.

History and discovery 

Pachyrhizodus fossils were first collected from Cambridgeshire, England in the 1840s and were very fragmentary, only a partial maxilla (SMB.9097) and were described as a species of Raphiosaurus in 1842 by Richard Owen. The type remains of Pachyrhizodus consisted of a maxilla (BMNH 49014) from the Lower Cretaceous of Sussex, England and was originally thought to be a mandible that Louis Agassiz dubbed Pachyrhizodus in 1850, with Frederick Dixon creating the species name basalis for the specimen. Over the next few years, many Pachyrhizodus species would be named only from England until in 1872, Edward Drinker Cope described large remains from the Smoky Hill Chalk of Kansas of several new species. During the 19th century, several complete and partial skeletons of Pachyrhizodus were collected from England, many of which belonging to P. basalis and P. subulidens. In 1899, Alban Stewart described the mandibles of another species, P. minimus, from Kansas and it is the most commonly discovered species of Pachyrhizodus. Since the 19th century, many complete skeletons and species have been described from many regions. P. caninus specifically has been discovered in the United States, Mexico, and New Zealand.

References

Bibliography 
  
 

Crossognathiformes
Prehistoric ray-finned fish genera
Cretaceous bony fish
Cenomanian genus first appearances
Maastrichtian genus extinctions
Late Cretaceous fish of North America
Cretaceous Canada
Fossils of Canada
Cretaceous United States
Mooreville Chalk
Late Cretaceous animals of South America
Cretaceous fish of South America
Cretaceous Colombia
Fossils of Colombia
Cretaceous fish of Europe
Cretaceous England
Fossils of England
Cretaceous Sweden
Fossils of Sweden
Fossil taxa described in 1850